The Church of San Agustín is a Roman Catholic church located in Madrid, Spain.

Described as "one of the best examples of 20th century religious architecture in the Community of Madrid", it was declared Bien de Interés Cultural in 2019.

See also 
Catholic Church in Spain
List of oldest church buildings

References 

Buildings and structures in El Viso neighborhood, Madrid
Roman Catholic churches in Madrid
Bien de Interés Cultural landmarks in Madrid